John Wesley Hill (May 8, 1863 – October 12, 1936) was an American Methodist minister, political activist, author, and the chancellor of Lincoln Memorial University in Harrogate, Tennessee from 1916 to 1936.

Early life
Hill was born on May 8, 1863 in Kalida, Ohio. Hill's father was John Wesley Hill (1831-1913). Hill's mother was Elizabeth Hughes Hill (1838-1926). Hill attended Ohio Northern University and then took classes at the Methodist Boston Theological Seminary.

Pastoral career
While still taking classes Hill became the pastor of a church in Eggleston Square in Boston. He went on to lead churches in Ogden, Utah; Helena, Montana; and Minneapolis, where he organized and built the Fowler Episcopal Methodist Church. He went on to positions in Fostoria, Ohio and Harrisburg, Pennsylvania, where he was appointed chaplain to the Pennsylvania state senate. Around 1905 he moved to the Janes United Methodist Church in Brooklyn, and then to the Metropolitan Temple at 7th Avenue and West 13th Street in New York City.

Politics

Hill was known for mixing politics and religion, campaigning for example with William H. Taft. During World War I Hill was involved with several organizations campaigning for peace and world governance, serving as general secretary of the World's Court League 1915-6 (and editor of their publication, The World's Court) and president of the International Peace Forum.

Hill published through the Peace Forum a debate he participated in on May 7, 1913 with Dr. Bouck White on the question "Resolved: That socialism is a peril to the state and the church" (with Hill affirming the proposition). Inez Milholland was the moderator.

Academic career 
Hill was the chancellor of Lincoln Memorial University in Harrogate, Tennessee from 1916 to 1936.

Hill wrote Twin City Methodism: A History of the Methodist Episcopal Church in Minneapolis and St. Paul, Minn. (1895) and Abraham Lincoln: Man of God in 1920.

Personal life 
Hill's wife was Sally Harrison Hill.
Hill died on October 12, 1936 at the Commodore Hotel in Manhattan, New York City.

Legacy 
His papers are archived at Columbia University.

References 

1863 births
1936 deaths
American Methodist clergy
Ohio Northern University alumni
Lincoln Memorial University
People from Claiborne County, Tennessee
People from Kalida, Ohio